Sybra bioculata is a species of beetle in the family Cerambycidae. It was described by Pic in 1925. It contains four subspecies: Sybra bioculata bioculata, Sybra bioculata quadrinotata, Sybra bioculata sikkimana, and Sybra bioculata tigrina.

References

bioculata
Beetles described in 1925